The Scantic River (pronounced SKAN-tik) is a river that flows through the states of Massachusetts and Connecticut and is tributary to the Connecticut River.

The Scantic River's tributaries rise in the towns of Hampden, Wilbraham, East Longmeadow and Monson in Massachusetts, and in Stafford and Somers, Connecticut, forming the river in the town of Hampden, Massachusetts southeast of Springfield. The Scantic flows southwest for  through the towns and communities of Hampden, Massachusetts; Somers, Somersville, Scitico, Hazardville, Enfield, East Windsor, Broad Brook, Scantic, South Windsor, and East Windsor Hill, Connecticut, until joining the Connecticut River near the East Windsor Hill community, part of South Windsor.

There are two areas named after the river. One is a small community, part of East Windsor. The other is in the southeast section of Hampden, near the corner of Scantic Road and Rock-A-Dundee Road.

Among things named after the river are several roads, the Scantic River Valley YMCA, the Scantic River Artists, the Scantic River Watershed Assn., and many others.

See also
List of rivers of Connecticut

References

External links
Scantic River Watershed Association official website

Enfield, Connecticut
Rivers of Hartford County, Connecticut
Rivers of Hampden County, Massachusetts
Tributaries of the Connecticut River
Rivers of Massachusetts
Rivers of Connecticut